Plumas-Eureka State Park is a California state park located in the Sierra Nevada and Cascade Range in Plumas County, California.

The park, as a mining museum, shows and protects the history of the active mid-19th century California Gold Rush mining period. As a large natural area it shows and protects the serenity of the mountain's meadows, forests, lakes, and granite peaks.    Camping, picnicking, biking, fishing, and hiking are offered.

Mining history
The historic mining area includes a museum in the miner's bunkhouse, the Mohawk Stamp Mill, Bushman five-stamp mill, stables, a blacksmith shop, the mine office, and a miner’s home "Moriarity House".

A California Historical Landmark marker is located in the park honoring the mining areas of Jamison City, Eureka Mills, Johnstown, and the Eureka Mine.

Natural history

Plumas-Eureka State Park is in the Sierra Nevada Coniferous Forest ecosystem of the Temperate Coniferous Forests Biome.  The park's animals include black bear, deer, weasel, mink, marten, mountain lion, bobcat, fox, and many others. The park is within the Feather River watershed and encompasses some of its headwaters.

Access
Plumas-Eureka State Park is located about 60 miles north of Lake Tahoe in Northern California. It is five miles west of Blairsden on County Road A-14.

Proposed closure 
This is one of the 48 California state parks proposed for closure in January 2008 by California's Governor Arnold Schwarzenegger as part of a deficit reduction program since rescinded following public outcry.  Plumas-Eureka State Park, except during the winter season, is open to the public.

See also
List of California state parks
Protected areas of the Sierra Nevada

References

External links
official Plumas-Eureka State Park website
Plumas-Eureka Park Association website

Protected areas of the Sierra Nevada (United States)
Mining museums in California
Parks in Plumas County, California
California Gold Rush
Feather Headwaters
Feather River
State parks of California
Museums in Plumas County, California
Protected areas established in 1959